Choe Un-gyong (born 29 July 1990 in South Hamgyong Province) is a North Korean freestyle wrestler. She competed in the freestyle 63 kg event at the 2012 Summer Olympics; she was defeated by Jing Ruixue in the 1/8 finals and eliminated by Monika Michalik in the repechage round.

References

External links
 

1990 births
Living people
North Korean female sport wrestlers

Olympic wrestlers of North Korea
Wrestlers at the 2012 Summer Olympics
People from South Hamgyong